A Journey to the New World: The Diary of Remember Patience Whipple, Mayflower, 1620 is a historical novel for young readers. It is the first book in the series Dear America. Remember Patience Whipple is a girl who was on board the Mayflower and is sailing from England. She is headed toward the New World with her family of four. Mr. Whipple is Patience’s father and can fix things. Mam, Patience’s mother, and Blessing who is Patience’s little sister. Patience has a friend called Hummy and she too is sailing on the Mayflower to the New World. Hummy's father is who takes care of her, because Hummy's mother died, this makes Hummy's father very melancholic. This is the first novel in the Dear America series.

External links
 A Journey to the New World on Goodreads

1996 American novels
American children's novels
American historical novels
Children's historical novels
English colonization of the Americas
Fictional diaries
Mayflower
Fiction set in 1620
Novels by Kathryn Lasky
1996 children's books